The 2019 Syed Modi International Badminton Championships (officially known as the Ecogreen Syed Modi International Badminton Championships 2019 for sponsorship reasons) was a badminton tournament which took place at the Babu Banarasi Das Indoor Stadium in Lucknow, India, from 26 November to 1 December 2019 and had a total prize of $150,000.

Tournament
The 2019 Syed Modi International was the twenty-sixth and last tournament of the 2019 BWF World Tour before the 2019 BWF World Tour Finals. However, this tournament was not calculated in the rankings used as qualification for the World Tour Finals. It was part of the Syed Modi International Badminton Championships, which had been held since 1991. It was organized by Badminton Association of India and sanctioned by the BWF.

Venue
This international tournament was held at the Babu Banarasi Das Indoor Stadium in Lucknow, Uttar Pradesh, India.

Point distribution
Below is the point distribution for each phase of the tournament based on the BWF points system for the BWF World Tour Super 300 event.

Prize money
The total prize money for this tournament was US$150,000. Distribution of prize money was in accordance with BWF regulations.

Men's singles

Seeds

 Shi Yuqi (first round)
 Ng Ka Long (withdrew)
 Srikanth Kidambi (quarter-finals)
 B. Sai Praneeth (second round)
 Sameer Verma (first round)
 Lu Guangzu (withdrew)
 Son Wan-ho (semi-finals)
 Wang Tzu-wei (champion)

Finals

Top half

Section 1

Section 2

Bottom half

Section 3

Section 4

Women's singles

Seeds

 He Bingjiao (withdrew)
 Michelle Li (withdrew)
 Saina Nehwal (withdrew)
 Carolina Marín (champion)
 An Se-young (second round)
 Han Yue (withdrew)
 Pornpawee Chochuwong (first round)
 Cai Yanyan (withdrew)

Finals

Top half

Section 1

Section 2

Bottom half

Section 3

Section 4

Men's doubles

Seeds

 Han Chengkai / Zhou Haodong (semi-finals)
 Satwiksairaj Rankireddy / Chirag Shetty (first round)
 Choi Sol-gyu / Seo Seung-jae (final)
 Liao Min-chun / Su Ching-heng (quarter-finals)
 He Jiting / Tan Qiang (champions)
 Marcus Ellis / Chris Langridge (withdrew)
 Mark Lamsfuß / Marvin Emil Seidel (quarter-finals)
 Vladimir Ivanov / Ivan Sozonov (quarter-finals)

Finals

Top half

Section 1

Section 2

Bottom half

Section 3

Section 4

Women's doubles

Seeds

 Chen Qingchen / Jia Yifan (withdrew)
 Du Yue / Li Yinhui (withdrew)
 Li Wenmei / Zheng Yu (withdrew)
 Chang Ye-na / Kim Hye-rin (final)
 Liu Xuanxuan / Xia Yuting (withdrew)
 Ekaterina Bolotova / Alina Davletova (second round)
 Baek Ha-na / Jung Kyung-eun (champions)
 Ashwini Ponnappa / N. Sikki Reddy (second round)

Finals

Top half

Section 1

Section 2

Bottom half

Section 3

Section 4

Mixed doubles

Seeds

 Marcus Ellis / Lauren Smith (final)
 Tang Chun Man / Tse Ying Suet (quarter-finals)
 Chris Adcock / Gabby Adcock (withdrew)
 He Jiting / Du Yue (withdrew)
 Mark Lamsfuß / Isabel Herttrich (semi-finals)
 Thom Gicquel / Delphine Delrue (semi-finals)
 Ben Lane / Jessica Pugh (withdrew)
 Rodion Alimov / Alina Davletova (champions)

Finals

Top half

Section 1

Section 2

Bottom half

Section 3

Section 4

References

External links
 Tournament Link

Syed Modi International Badminton Championships
Syed Modi International
Syed Modi International
Syed Modi International
Syed Modi International